The Hardkiss (stylised as The HARDKISS) is a Ukrainian rock band.

The Hardkiss participated in the Ukrainian national selection for the Eurovision Song Contest 2016 with the song "Helpless". The band placed 2nd in the national final.

History

The Hardkiss were formed in 2011 by lead singer Julia Sanina and guitarist Valeriy Bebko. In September the band presented their debut video "Babylon". They were the opening act for Hurts on 20 October and Solange Knowles on 18 November in Kyiv.

In 2012, The Hardkiss were nominated for the MTV Europe Music Award for Best Ukrainian Act. The band performed at MIDEM festival on 29 January.

In 2013, The Hardkiss won two awards – "Best New Act" and "Best Music Video" (to producer Valeriy Bebko for clip Make-Up) – of the national music award . On 18 May the band presented their first show in the Green Theatre in Kyiv. They opened the Muz-TV Music Awards on 7 June. That year The Hardkiss became "voice and face" of Pepsi in Ukraine. The band took part in a tour, Pepsi Stars of Now, in 16 cities.

In 2015, the band was nominated for the music award YUNA again, having won in two categories: "The best music album" (album Stones and Honey) and "The best song" (single Stones).

In 2016, they took part in the Ukrainian national selection for the Eurovision Song Contest 2016.

Julia Sanina was one of four judges on the seventh series of The X Factor Ukraine.

In 2018, the band won two awards at YUNA: Best Rock Band and Best Song in Ukrainian ("Zhuravli").

Members

 Current members
 Julia Sanina – vocals (2011–present)
 Valeriy "Val" Bebko –  guitar (2011–present)
 Klim Lysiuk – bass guitar (2016–present)
 Yevhen Kibeliev – drums (2019–present)

 Former members
 Pol Solonar – keyboards (2011–2013)
 Vitaliy Oniskevich – keyboards (2013–2016)
 Roman Skorobahatko – guitar (2013–2018)
 Kreechy (Dmytro Smotrov) – drums (2011–2019)

The authorship of songs of the band belongs to Julia Sanina and Valeriy Bebko. Also Valeriy Bebko is the creative producer of The Hardkiss and video director.

Discography

Albums
 2014 — Stones and Honey
 2017 — Perfection Is a Lie
 2018 — Залізна ластівка
 2021 — Жива і не залізна

Live Albums
 2020 — Акустика. Live

EPs
 2015 — Cold Altair

Singles
 2011 — "Babylon"
 2011 — "Dance With Me"
 2012 — "Make-Up"
 2012 — "October"
 2013 — "Part Of Me"
 2013 — "In Love"
 2013 — "Under The Sun"
 2013 — "Shadows Of Time"
 2013 — "Tell Me Brother"
 2014 — "Hurricane"
 2014 — "Stones"
 2014 — "Strange Moves" feat. KAZAKY
 2015 — "PiBiP"
 2015 — "Organ"
 2015 — "Tony, Talk!"
 2016 — "Helpless"
 2016 — "Perfection!"
 2016 — "Rain"
 2016 — "Closer"
 2017 — "Антарктида"
 2017 — "Журавлi"
 2017 — "Lovers"
 2017 — "Кораблі"
 2018 — "Мелодія"
 2018 — "Free me"
 2018 — "Коханці"
 2019 — "Серце"
 2019 — "Хто, як не ти?"
 2019 — "Жива"
 2020 — "Косатка"
 2020 — "Гора"
 2020 — "Кобра" feat. MONATIK
 2020 — "Все було так"
 2021 — "Обійми"
 2021 — "7 вітрів"
 2021 — "Сестра"
 2022 — "Як ти?
 2022 — "Маяк"

See also
Ukraine in the Eurovision Song Contest 2016

References

External links 
 
  
 
 

2011 establishments in Ukraine
Musical groups established in 2011
Ukrainian pop music groups
Ukrainian rock music groups
English-language singers from Ukraine
Female-fronted musical groups